Curry in the Crown: The Story of Britain's Favourite Dish is a 1999 book written by Shrabani Basu. The book discusses how Indian food became a million dollar business in the United Kingdom.

Reception

Tunku Varadarajan, writing in India Today, said that the history of Indian food in the United Kingdom was a compelling story.  However he called Basu's book "shoddily written and mind-bogglingly banal", offering "no anthropological insights, few historical perspectives, no literary conspectus, little sociological research".

References

1999 non-fiction books
English-language books
Indian cuisine in the United Kingdom
Mass media of Indian diaspora